William Andrew Hazel, Jr.   is the current Virginia Secretary of Health and Human Resources. He was first appointed in 2010 by Governor Bob McDonnell and was reappointed in 2014 by Governor Terry McAuliffe. He served previously as assistant orthopedic surgeon for the Washington Redskins and as team physician for D.C. United soccer club; he was also a member of the American Medical Association's Board of Trustees.

References

External links
 Virginia Secretary of Health and Human Services

Living people
1956 births
State cabinet secretaries of Virginia
People from Arlington County, Virginia
People from Oakton, Virginia
Duke University School of Medicine alumni
Princeton University School of Engineering and Applied Science alumni